WSRB (106.3 FM) is an urban adult contemporary radio station serving the Chicago metropolitan area and Northwest Indiana. It is licensed to the Southland suburb of Lansing, Illinois, and transmits within that city from a tower along the north side of the Kingery Expressway. The station is owned by Crawford Broadcasting and its studios are in Hammond, Indiana.

WSRB broadcasts in the HD Radio format.

History
The station began broadcasting on August 28, 1961 as WLNR, which stood for "West Lansing Near Railroad". It aired a full service format playing Middle of the road (MOR) music, including pop standards and easy listening. In the 1970s, talk programming would begin to occupy more of the station's schedule, with religious programming airing in overnights. From 1973 to 1985, the station was home to the Warren Freiberg - Libby Collins Show, which would later be heard on WCGO in Chicago Heights, Illinois and WTAS in Crete, Illinois. The Station was purchased by Johnson Publishing Company in 1985. In the late 1980s and early 1990s, the station aired a Soft urban contemporary format branded "Soft Touch", which was simulcast on its sister station AM 950 WJPC.

WJPC
On March 11, 1991, WLNR relaunched as "J106". On April 15, 1991, the station's callsign would be changed to WJPC-FM, which stood for Johnson Publishing Company, the station's owner at the time. This would give the station the same callsign as its sister station, AM 950 WJPC. The stations continued to simulcast and aired an Urban AC format, and competed against WVAZ (though WJPC (AM) would break off from the simulcast and flip to a rap-heavy urban contemporary format in July 1992).

WEJM
In June 1994, Broadcast Partners, which owned WVAZ, acquired WJPC AM/FM from Johnson Publishing. The new owners changed the callsign to WEJM-FM, and flipped formats to a Rap-heavy Urban contemporary format as "106 Jamz" on June 19, as well as effectively returning the stations to a full-time simulcast. This placed the stations in competition with the market's Urban contemporary leader WGCI. Their AM simulcast partner would also change call letters to WEJM. Broadcast Partners would later merge with Evergreen Media in July 1995. In March 1997, due to several mergers which put Evergreen over federally-mandated ownership limits, WEJM-FM was sold to Crawford Broadcasting, who would change the station's format to Urban Gospel in April, though its simulcast partner WEJM 950 (which was sold to Personal Achievement Radio) would continue to air the Urban/Rap format for several months after until it flipped to sports talk as a station of the One-on-One Sports Network on August 28.

WYBA/WYCA
During this time, WYBA aired Urban Gospel music and brokered religious programming as "Your Born Again Gospel Station". On December 1, 1999, the station's branding was changed to "Power 106", and the brokered religious programming that aired on the station were moved to sister stations WYCA and WYAA, giving 106.3 a full-time Urban Gospel format. The call letters were changed from to WYCA in 2001 after WYCA (then at 92.3 FM) dropped its longtime Gospel/brokered Christian format in favor of Urban Contemporary. The call letters WYBA were moved to 102.3.

WSRB
The station adopted an Adult Urban contemporary format on September 30, 2003 (the Urban Gospel format would move to WYCA (102.3 FM)).

WSRB was the home to the syndicated Love, Lust and Lies with Michael Baisden. It was also the home to the Steve Harvey morning show until August 1, 2007. On March 25, 2009, rival WVAZ dropped The Tom Joyner Morning Show in favor of Harvey's. But on April 22, 2009, WSRB brought Joyner back.

Until June 2010, "Soul 106.3 FM" had a synchronous sister station, WYRB, airing on the same frequency and serving Rockford and DeKalb, Illinois.  WYRB dropped out of the simulcast in June 2010 and adopted a standalone "Rhythmic" format under the name "Power 106.3".  Soul 106.3 continues to air on 106.3 HD2.

On November 1, 2010, WSRB dropped its Urban AC format for Talk under the banner "Real Radio." Joyner and Baisden were retained under the new format due to their shows being less music and more talk, and they were joined by Dave Ramsey and Warren Ballentine throughout the day. The station continued to play Adult R&B music, but during the late evenings and weekends.

In August 2011, WSRB dropped the name "Real Radio" and switched back to calling itself "Soul 106-3," but the programming was initially unchanged.

In 2014, the station dropped the D.L. Hughley syndicated afternoon show after only a year.  (Hughley replaced Michael Baisden in many markets in 2013.)

In late 2016, WSRB dropped the "Soul 106-3" branding, and is simply referred to as "106-3" or sometimes "106-3 Chicago."  Under the name brand change, it skewed its urban adult contemporary format to include classic hip hop in addition to R&B and soul music.  In June 2017, the station dropped the Tom Joyner Morning Show in favor of a local morning drive hosted by Mike Love.

References

External links
 Official website
Owner Website

SRB
Urban adult contemporary radio stations in the United States
Radio stations established in 1961
1961 establishments in Illinois